Robert Klonsky (12 March 1918 – September 7, 2002) was a member of the Abraham Lincoln Brigade, which fought on the side of the Spanish Republicans in the Spanish Civil War.

Biography
Klonsky was born in 1918 in a house on Eastern Parkway in the Brownsville/East New York neighborhood of Brooklyn. His parents were poor religious Jews who had emigrated from Russia. His father was a rabbi or a cantor. Klonsky's brother Ben became the chief cantor of Reading, Pennsylvania, while his brother Mac became a Communist.

Klonsky and Walter Lowenfels were defendants in a trial in the mid-1950s of nine Philadelphia members of the Communist Party. They were convicted in 1954 of violating the Smith Act, which outlawed "teaching or advocating the overthrow of the American government by force". He served over a year at the federal penitentiary at Allenwood, Pennsylvania, before the Justice Department withdrew charges in 1958.

After 1958, Klonsky lived in California, where he ran a bookstore near UCLA and where he remained active in organizing workers in the film industry. His son, Michael Klonsky, also became active in politics, becoming a national secretary of the Students for a Democratic Society and later leader of the Communist Party (Marxist-Leninist). Robert Klonsky supported the jailed professor Angela Davis, demonstrated against the Vietnam War and had a few acting parts in movies. He and other survivors of the Spanish war were made honorary citizens of Spain in 1998.

Klonsky died on September 7, 2002, in Chicago at the age of 84. His ashes were scattered off the coast of Barcelona.

References

External links
 Robert Klonsky, Spanish Civil War Vet, John Johnson.
 Photo of Robert Klonsky, 1937, Peter Stackpole.
Robert Klonsky Papers at Tamiment Library and Robert F. Wagner Labor Archives at New York University Special Collections.

1918 births
2002 deaths
Abraham Lincoln Brigade members
American communists
20th-century American Jews
American people of Russian-Jewish descent
Jewish anti-fascists
Jewish socialists
People convicted under the Smith Act
21st-century American Jews